This is a complete list of songs by the Korean girl group Kara.

0–9

A

B

D

E

F

G

H

I

J

K

L

M

O

P

R

S

T

U

W

Y

Other songs

See also
Kara discography

 
Kara